Marasany is a rural locality (a village) in Polozovoskoye Rural Settlement, Bolshesosnovsky District, Perm Krai, Russia. The population was 87 as of 2010. There are 3 streets.

Geography 
Marasany is located 38 km southwest of Bolshaya Sosnova (the district's administrative centre) by road. Sivinskoye is the nearest rural locality.

References 

Rural localities in Bolshesosnovsky District